Bishop Ready High School is a Catholic high school located in Columbus, Ohio. It is part of the Roman Catholic Diocese of Columbus. The original building opened in 1961 and consisted of two floors of 22 classrooms and an Art and Shop Wing with three classrooms. In 1999 a science wing consisting of three rooms was opened and in 2004 a band room, weight room, trainer's office, and wrestling room were added. The original building covers a total area of 95,695 sq. ft. and cost $1,237,000 total to construct.

Ohio High School Athletic Association State Championships

 Basketball — 1972, 1973
 Football – 1983
 Wrestling – 1982, 1990
 Girls Softball – 1995
 Girls Track & Field Shot put - Emily Morris OHSAA 2011 State Champion
 Boys Track & Field 110M High Hurdles- Nick Frye OHSAA 2011 State Champion

Notes and references

External links
School Website

1961 establishments in Ohio
Catholic secondary schools in Ohio
Educational institutions established in 1961
High schools in Columbus, Ohio
Roman Catholic Diocese of Columbus